Mirani is a town in the Sindh province of Pakistan. It is located at 27°14'45N 68°39'20E with an altitude of 38 metres (127 feet).

Mirani is also the name of a caste in Sindh.

References

Populated places in Sindh